is a Japanese actress.

Kuno has been active as a model since senior high school, and as an actress made her debut in 1987. In 1986, she participated in the first Pocari Sweat Image Girl Contest, but lost to 17-year-old Chisato Moritaka in the finals. Kuno was the image girl of the JR East kiosks from 1988 to 1994. In 1994, she released a collection of photographs, Mitsu, and appeared nude in an original video, XX: Utsukushiki Karyūdo. In 1998, Kuno played the part of Sunday in the Chunsoft sound novel Machi to a favorable reception.  In addition, she qualified as a sommelier in 1998.

Filmography

Movies
 Banana Shoot (1989) as Fuko Hosaka
 Taro! Tokyo makai taisen (1991) as Yasuhara
 The Guard from Underground (1992) as Akiko Narushima
 Fuyu no kappa (1995) as Tamako
 Mari's Prey  マリ-の獲物 (1996)
 The Mars Canon (2001) as  Kinuko
 World's End Girlfriend Sekai no owari (2005)
 Mushishi (2006) as Maho's mother

Television
 Ultraman Gaia (1998) as Kyoko Inamori
 Urutora kyû: Dâku fantajî (2004) TV series... a.k.a. Ultra Q: Dark Fantasy

Game
Machi (1998)

Original video
XX: Beautiful Hunter XX: Utsukushiki karyuudo (1994).... Shion
Oretachi wa tenshi ja nai (1993).... EriOretachi wa tenshi ja nai 2 (1993).... Eri
Sugar: Howling of Angel (1996)
Inagawa Junji no shinjitsu no horror (2003)... a.k.a. J-Horror Anthology: Legends

References

External links
official site
fan site

JMDb Profile (in Japanese)

1967 births
Living people
People from Maebashi
Sommeliers
Japanese film actresses
Japanese television actresses
20th-century Japanese actresses
21st-century Japanese actresses